Otto Gruppe (18 July 1851, Berlin – 27 November 1921, Berlin) was a German mythographer, remembered for his Griechische Mythologie und Religion-Geschichte (1906), in which used surviving texts to survey the historical development of Greek mythology and religion. He was also the author of Geschichte der Klassischen Mythologie und Religionsgeschichte während des Mittelalters in Abendland und während der Neuzeit (History of Classical Mythology and History of Religion in Medieval Western Europe and the Modern Age).
 
Otto Gruppe was the son of the philosopher, scholar-poet and philologist Otto Friedrich Gruppe (1804–1876).

References
Ludwig Bernays (ed.), Otto Friedrich Gruppe 1804-1876: Philosoph, Dichter, Philologe. (Paradeigmata 3) (Freiburg-in-Breisgau: Rombach Verlag) 2004.

External links
 

 Otto Gruppe de.Wikisource

1851 births
1921 deaths
Mythographers
Writers from Berlin
German classical philologists